Adolescents are humans between the developmental stage of puberty and adulthood.

Adolescent(s) or Adolescence may also refer to:

Films
Adolescence (film), a 1966 French documentary
The Adolescent (film), French title L'Adolescente, 1978-79 French drama film directed by Jeanne Moreau
The Adolescents (film), a 1968 Mexican drama directed by Abel Salazar
Adolescence (film), a 1966 French short documentary by Marin Karmitz

Literature
The Adolescent (book), and An Accidental Family, two alternative titles for The Raw Youth, a novel by Russian writer Fyodor Dostoevsky

Music
Adolescents (band), an American punk rock band
Adolescents (album), 1981 album by the eponymous band
"Adolescents" (song), a 2011 song by Incubus
Adolescence (EP), 2015, by Gnarwolves
Adolescence (ballet), 1929, by Martha Graham and Paul Hindemith
Adolescence (mixtape), 2021, by Unknown T

See also
Teenager (disambiguation)
Youth (disambiguation)